Madinani Department is a department of Kabadougou Region in Denguélé District, Ivory Coast. In 2021, its population was 50,248 and its seat is the settlement of Madinani. The sub-prefectures of the department are Fengolo, Madinani, and N'Goloblasso.

History
Madinani Department was created in 2005 as a second-level subdivision via a split-off from Odienné Department. At its creation, it was part of Denguélé Region.

In 2011, districts were introduced as new first-level subdivisions of Ivory Coast. At the same time, regions were reorganised and became second-level subdivisions and all departments were converted into third-level subdivisions. At this time, Madinani Department became part of Kabadougou Region in Denguélé District.

Notes

Departments of Kabadougou
2005 establishments in Ivory Coast
States and territories established in 2005